Roger De Courcey (born 10 December 1944 in London, England) is a British ventriloquist, best known for performing with Nookie Bear. He was the winner of the 1976 New Faces televised talent competition grand final.

Biography
De Courcey has performed on the West End stage, in productions of musicals Sweet Charity, Two Cities and Company. He has appeared at the London Palladium many times including the 1976 Royal Variety Performance in the presence of Queen Elizabeth The Queen Mother.

In 1978 he released 'Nookie's Song', on the Pye Records Label.

A freemason, he is a member of Chelsea Lodge No. 3098, the membership of which is made up of entertainers. De Courcey is also a member and former "King Rat" of the Grand Order of Water Rats which is the oldest theatrical fraternity in the world. De Courcey is also an agent, and represents musician Rick Wakeman and broadcaster David "Kid" Jensen.

In 2008, De Courcey and Nookie made a cameo appearance in Episode 7, Series 1, of Ashes to Ashes on BBC One.

De Courcey is also a fan of Crystal Palace Football Club.

References

External links
Official website

1944 births
Living people
Freemasons of the United Grand Lodge of England
Place of birth missing (living people)
British male comedians
Comedians from London
Ventriloquists